Naudhia is a census town in Sidhi district in the Indian state of Madhya Pradesh.

Demographics
 India census, Naudhia had a population of 7,143. Males constitute 54% of the population and females 46%. Naudhia has an average literacy rate of 69%, higher than the national average of 59.5%: male literacy is 77%, and female literacy is 59%. In Naudhia, 15% of the population is under 6 years of age.

References

Cities and towns in Sidhi district